The next Welsh Labour leadership election is an expected election within Welsh Labour. Current leader Mark Drakeford was elected in December 2018 on a pledge to serve five years, this means a contest could occur in late 2023 or possibly in 2024. The next scheduled Senedd election is due on or before 7 May 2026.

Background

In July 2020, Drakeford said around his 70th birthday (in September 2024) would "be time for somebody else to have a chance to do this job."

In December 2022, Drakeford stated that he expected to leave his role in 2024.

In January 2023, The Guardian reported that Drakeford "expects to step down in the second half of this Senedd term, which began in 2021 and runs until 2026" with Drakeford himself stating that “We’re nowhere near halfway through this term yet. The time will come when this is the right thing to do.”

In January 2023, Will Hayward, Welsh Affairs Editor at WalesOnline predicted that a new leader would be in place by the end of 2023.

Nominations

Under the current rules in order to become a candidate, individuals required 20% of current Labour AMs (now MSs) to nominate them. This equated to six, including themselves.

Possible Candidates

The following have been touted as potential candidates:

Vaughan Gething
Senedd member for Cardiff South and Penarth since 2011, former Health Minister (2016–2021) and current Economy Minister (since 2021). Finished second in the 2018 contest.

Jeremy Miles
Senedd member for Neath since 2016, former Counsel General for Wales (2017–2021) and current Education Minister (since 2021).

Eluned Morgan
Senedd member for Mid and West Wales since 2016, Former MEP (1994–2009) and current Minister for Health and Social Services (since 2021). Finished third in the 2018 contest.

References

Political party leadership elections in Wales
Welsh Labour Party leadership elections